Los Ángeles is a ward (barrio) of Madrid belonging to the district of Villaverde.

Wards of Madrid
Villaverde (Madrid)